Milutin Morača (7 July 1914 – 17 December 2003) was a Yugoslav partisan, general of Yugoslav People's Army and People's Hero of Yugoslavia. His brother Pero, was historian and also a partisan. 

Prior to World War II, his family settled in village Žednik near Subotica, where Milutin, as law student, joined then the illegal Communist Party of Yugoslavia. He was mobilized in the Royal Yugoslav Army after the Yugoslav coup d'état. After Yugoslav defeat in the April War, he was captured by the Hungarian army, but he was soon released and, as a colonist, he was to forced return to his birth area. There he joined  local communists in their preparation for the uprising against the Independent State of Croatia and Axis occupation.

Between May 1943 and January 1945, he was commander of the 5th Krajina Division. He led the division during the Belgrade Operation.
He was appointed Chief of Staff of the First Army of the NOVJ in 1945, and during the breakthrough of the Syrmian Front, he directly commanded the Northern Group of Divisions.

After World War II, Morača held various high posts in Yugoslav People's Army, Federal Executive Council and federal and republic parliaments.

References

Sources 
 

1914 births
2003 deaths
Yugoslav Partisans members
Recipients of the Order of the People's Hero
Generals of the Yugoslav People's Army